The 1965 Auburn Tigers football team represented Auburn University in the 1965 NCAA University Division football season. It was the Tigers' 74th overall and 32nd season as a member of the Southeastern Conference (SEC). The team was led by head coach Ralph "Shug" Jordan, in his 15th year, and played their home games at Cliff Hare Stadium in Auburn and Legion Field in Birmingham, Alabama. They finished with a record of five wins, five losses and one tie (5–5–1 overall, 4–1–1 in the SEC) and with a loss against Ole Miss in the Liberty Bowl.

Schedule

<

References

Auburn
Auburn Tigers football seasons
Auburn Tigers football